Jan Vonka (born May 17, 1963 in Slaný) is a Czech auto racing driver and team owner.

Career
Vonka originally competed in rallying in the early 1980s, before moving on to hillclimbing. In 1999 he won the Czech Circuit Racing Championship with his Vonka Racing team.

Vonka began competing in the N-GT class of the FIA GT Championship in 2002. He began competing more regularly in FIA GT in 2004, when he finished ninth overall in class, improving to finish sixth overall in class in 2005. In 2006, Vonka competed at the 12 Hours of Sebring. He also raced for Wiechers-Sport at the FIA WTCC Race of the Czech Republic.

Complete WTCC results
(key) (Races in bold indicate pole position) (Races in italics indicate fastest lap)

References

External links
 
 Jan Vonka at Driver Database

Living people
1963 births
Czech racing drivers
FIA GT Championship drivers
American Le Mans Series drivers
World Touring Car Championship drivers
24 Hours of Daytona drivers
Rolex Sports Car Series drivers
24 Hours of Spa drivers
People from Slaný
Sportspeople from the Central Bohemian Region